The Niagara Scenic Parkway (known as the Robert Moses State Parkway until 2016) is a  long north–south highway in western Niagara County, New York, in the United States. Its southern terminus is at the LaSalle Expressway on the east bank of the Niagara River in Niagara Falls. The northern terminus is at New York State Route 18 (NY 18) at Four Mile Creek State Park in Porter near Lake Ontario. Originally, the parkway was one continuous road; however, due to low usage, a portion of the parkway near Niagara Falls was removed, separating the parkway into two sections. The length of the parkway is designated as New York State Route 957A by the New York State Department of Transportation (NYSDOT). Both reference route designations are unsigned.

The parkway, a divided highway for most of its route, is one of the most unorthodox parkways in New York State, similar to Ocean Parkway on Long Island. Some portions, mainly between downtown Niagara Falls and Lewiston, are not built to freeway standards, and the parkway as a whole has gradually been relegated due to low usage.

Route description
The Niagara Scenic Parkway begins as a westward continuation of a spur off the LaSalle Expressway in Niagara Falls, New York. It connects with Interstate 190 (I-190) and NY 384 just west of its official southern terminus and passes under the North Grand Island Bridge as it heads west along the Niagara River.  west of I-190, the parkway turns north and returns to grade level at Buffalo Avenue, where it terminates and continues north as John B. Daly Boulevard (designated but not signed as NY 952B by NYSDOT).

The parkway begins again at Findlay Drive just before Whirlpool State Park. North of the park, the highway curves northeastward, matching the curvature of the gorge in the area. After serving the Devil's Hole State Park and interchanging with NY 104, it passes over the Robert Moses Niagara Power Plant. Many features are within view at this point: to the west of the parkway at this point are the Sir Adam Beck Hydroelectric Power Stations; to the north are the Lewiston–Queenston Bridge and the Niagara River's course for miles ahead. The parkway interchanges with I-190 via Upper Mountain Road before passing under the bridge and re-widening to four lanes.

Just north of the bridge, the Niagara Scenic Parkway approaches the edge of the Niagara Escarpment. Here, it is possible to see for several miles in any direction. Looking north, the remainder of the Niagara River can be seen, as can its mouth at Lake Ontario. The parkway descends the escarpment and meets NY 18F and NY 104 just east of the village of Lewiston. North of Lewiston, the Parkway follows a largely north–south routing as it passes through largely rural sections of the towns of Lewiston and Porter. During this stretch, it has an exit to Pletcher Road, which links the parkway to Joseph Davis State Park.

At the village of Youngstown, the Niagara Scenic Parkway interchanges with NY 93. North of the village, the parkway's median widens as it interchanges with a short spur (designated but not signed as NY 958A) leading to Fort Niagara State Park and Fort Niagara within. Past this junction, the parkway turns east and begins to parallel Lake Ontario. It passes under NY 18F and interchanges with Four Mile Creek Drive, the entry road for Four Mile Creek State Park, before terminating at an at-grade intersection with NY 18. The New York State Office of Parks, Recreation and Historic Preservation has jurisdiction over the parkway and its spur to Fort Niagara; however, NYSDOT maintains both highways.

History

Proposals for a limited-access highway to connect downtown Niagara Falls with the proposed Niagara Thruway, a spur of the New York State Thruway, surfaced by the 1950s. The general routing of the highway would begin at the Rainbow Bridge in downtown and parallel NY 384 on its north side to the North Grand Island Bridge, where it would turn south to meet the northern terminus of the Niagara Thruway. However, by the 1960s, a new alignment along the bank of the Niagara River and through the Niagara Falls State Park was selected instead. Two portions of the "Niagara Parkway", as it was then known, were completed by 1962. The first extended from the Niagara Thruway (Interstate 190) to the Rainbow Bridge. Another, representing a northward extension of the parkway, was open along the Niagara Gorge's eastern edge from Niagara Avenue to U.S. Route 104 in Lewiston. At the time, the sections from the Rainbow Bridge to Niagara Street and US 104 to Ridge Road in Lewiston were under construction. Both were open to traffic by 1964. An extension of the parkway, formerly named the "Robert Moses State Parkway" after public works developer Robert Moses, now named the Niagara Scenic Parkway, north to NY 18 in Porter was completed by 1968. A spur to Fort Niagara was built as part of the extension.

The Niagara Scenic Parkway was to have been part of a vast network of limited-access highways in the Buffalo area. Under the 1971 Regional Highway Plan for the Buffalo–Niagara Falls area, the parkway would have been paralleled by a westward extension of the LaSalle Expressway, which would have extended from the Rainbow Bridge to I-190 along the proposed routing shown on maps 20 years before. Farther north, the northern end of the Niagara Scenic Parkway in Porter would have linked to a western extension of the Lake Ontario State Parkway. Neither proposal ever came to fruition.

The portion of the Niagara Scenic Parkway within Niagara Falls State Park was closed and largely removed in the early 1980s as a result of a movement to restore the park to the original layout conceived for it by landscape architect Frederick Law Olmsted. As a result, the parkway became discontinuous. Its southern segment now began at the pre-existing interchange with Quay Street (John B. Daly Boulevard), which remained virtually untouched, while the southern end of the northern segment was reconfigured in the vicinity of downtown to terminate at an at-grade intersection with Main Street (NY 104). Traffic must now employ NY 384 to bridge the two sections of the parkway. The portions of the Niagara Scenic Parkway that still exist within Niagara Falls State Park are mostly in the vicinity of the Rainbow Bridge and are used for park business only.

Additional downgrading of the highway has occurred in other areas. From Cedar Avenue in downtown Niagara Falls to I-190 in Lewiston, the southbound lanes were gradually converted into a recreation/bike trail during the 2000s, funneling all traffic into the former northbound lanes and turning the parkway into a two-lane highway.

In February 2013, New York State announced that the segment of the Parkway from Main Street north to Findlay Drive would be removed, allowing improved access by residents and tourists on the city streets to the gorgefront. In early 2019, the stretch of parkway between Main Street (NY 104) and Findlay Drive was permanently closed and demolition began starting with the section of viaduct near the Whirlpool Rapids Bridge which was removed in mid-2019. Officials immediately started removing that segment while discussing the possible removal of a further stretch, from Findlay north to the NY 104/18F interchange in Lewiston. Engineering work for the removal of the first section began in April 2014. By July 2020, the section between Main Street and Findlay Drive was fully removed, and is set to be replaced by park land complete with bicycle and pedestrian paths.

Between 2014 and 2016, the Riverway Project, part of the Buffalo Billion state program, reconstructed and reconfigured a one-mile stretch of the Parkway near Goat Island. This included conversion of the John B. Daly Boulevard interchange into a roundabout which opened May 2015.

On June 9, 2016, Governor Andrew Cuomo announced that the Robert Moses State Parkway would be renamed the Niagara Scenic Parkway.

Exit list

Fort Niagara spur

See also
Niagara Parkway, the longer counterpart to the Niagara Scenic Parkway on the Ontario side of the Niagara River

References

External links

Buffalo / Niagara Falls: 1971 Regional Highway Plan

Parkways in New York (state)
Transportation in Niagara County, New York
Transportation in Niagara Falls, New York
Robert Moses projects
Demolished highways in the United States